1877 Orange colonial by-election may refer to 

 February 1877 Orange colonial by-election caused by the resignation of Harris Nelson
 August 1877 Orange colonial by-election caused by the ministerial appointment of Edward Combes

See also
 List of New South Wales state by-elections